Members of the Legislative Assembly of Samoa were elected on 9 April 2021. According to preliminary results, the 51 members consisted of 25 representatives of Fa'atuatua i le Atua Samoa ua Tasi (FAST), 25 from the Human Rights Protection Party (HRPP), one from the Tautua Samoa Party and one independent. Official results were declared on 16 April, resulting in some change to individual winners, but no change to the overall balance of power. Election petitions subsequently saw four HRPP MPs unseated, and three more resign as part of settlements.

Members

Changes
 On 18 June 2021 the election of the HRPP's Seiuli Ueligitone Seiuli was overturned by an election petition, which found him guilty of bribery and treating and banned him from office for 15 years.
 On 29 June 2021 Sagaga No. 4 Tuisa Tasi Patea resigned to avoid an election petition.
 On 5 July Aleipata Itupa i Lalo MP Fiugalu Eteuati Eteuati was convicted of 13 counts of bribery and treating in an electoral petition.
 On 7 July 2021 Safata No. 2 MP Nonu Lose Niumata resigned as part of the settlement of an electoral petition.
 On 9 July 2021 Falealupo MP Leota Tima Leavai resigned and agreed not to run in a by-election as part of an election petition settlement.
 On 16 August 2021 the election of Aana Alofi No.2 MP Aiono Afaese Toleafoa and Falealili No. 2 MP Fuimaono Teo Samuelu were both overturned by election petitions.
 On 22 November 2021 Fuiono Tenina Crichton was declared elected unopposed in Falealupo after his only opponent in the planned by-election was ruled to be ineligible by the Supreme Court.
 On 26 November 2021 the 2021 Samoan by-elections were held, resulting in Aiono Tile Gafa (HRPP) being elected in Aana Alofi No. 2; Titimaea Tafua (FAST) being elected in Aleipata Itupa i Lalo; Maiava Fuimaono Asafo (FAST) being elected in Falealili No. 2; Laumatiamanu Ringo Purcell (FAST) being elected in Safata No. 2; Maulolo Tavita Amosa being elected in Sagaga No. 2; and Tagaloatele Pasi Poloa (FAST) being elected in Sagaga No. 4.
 On 29 November 2021, following the by-elections, the electoral commission declared Ali'imalemanu Alofa Tuuau (HRPP) and Faagasealii Sapoa Feagiai (HRPP) elected as additional members under the women's quota. Their election was disputed by the Speaker, but on 12 May 2022 the Supreme Court  confirmed their election, and additionally declared To'omata Norah Leota (FAST) elected as an additional member due to the resignation of Leota Tima Leavai and her subsequent replacement by a man. The Supreme Court noted in its decision that when a man is elected to fill a constituency seat vacancy previously held by a woman, the constitutional requirement for a woman to be elected as an additional member is separate from the quota requirement. Thus there are now a record 7 women parliamentarians.
 On 25 March 2022, the Gaga'ifomauga 2 seat became vacant upon the death of FAST MP Va'ele Pa'ia'aua Iona Sekuini. Fo'isala Lilo Tu'u Ioane was elected in the resulting 2022 Gaga'ifomauga 2 by-election.

References

 2021
Samoa